Alexandre Olliero (born 15 February 1996) is a French professional footballer who plays as a goalkeeper for  club Reims.

Career
Olliero signed with FC Nantes in 2013 from his native ES La Rochelle where he started playing football at the age of 4. He extended his professional contract with Nantes on 17 October 2017 for five years, keeping him at the club until June 2023.

On 3 January 2018, Olliero joined Niort on loan in the Ligue 2 for the second half of the 2017–18 season. He made his professional debut for Niort in a 0–0 Ligue 2 tie with AS Nancy on 12 January 2018.

In July 2020, Olliero again left Nantes on loan, joining Pau FC, newly promoted to Ligue 2, for the 2020–21 season.

On 1 February 2023, Olliero signed with Ligue 1 club Reims for a 4 years contract.

References

External links
 
 
 

1996 births
Sportspeople from La Rochelle
Footballers from Nouvelle-Aquitaine
Living people
Association football goalkeepers
French footballers
FC Nantes players
Chamois Niortais F.C. players
Pau FC players
Stade de Reims players
Ligue 1 players
Ligue 2 players
Championnat National 2 players
Championnat National 3 players